The 2008 Scottish Challenge Cup final was played on 16 November 2008 and was the 18th Scottish Challenge Cup final. The final was contested by Ross County who beat Greenock Morton 4–1 in their semi-final and Airdrie United who beat Partick Thistle 1–0. The match was played at McDiarmid Park, Perth. Airdrie won the game 3–2 on penalties, after the match ended 2–2 following extra time.

Both teams had appeared in a Challenge Cup final before, Ross County had been in two, defeating Clyde on penalties in the 2006 final but losing the 2004 final to Falkirk. whereas Airdrie's only final ended in defeat, losing to Inverness Caledonian Thistle in the 2003 final.

Route to the final

Airdrie United

Ross County

Match details

References

2008
Ross County F.C. matches
Airdrieonians F.C. matches
Challenge Cup Final
Association football penalty shoot-outs
Sport in Perth, Scotland